The Nubian ibex (Capra nubiana) is a desert-dwelling goat species (Genus Capra) found in mountainous areas of northern and northeast Africa, and the Middle East. It was historically considered to be a subspecies of the Alpine ibex (C. ibex), but is now considered a distinct species. The wild population is estimated at 4,500 mature individuals.

Description
Nubian ibex are the smallest ibex species on Earth, following Bergmann's Rule. They stand around 65–75 cm (2.1–2.6 ft) tall at the shoulder. They are sexually dimorphic: males are significantly larger than females, with males averaging 52-74.7 kg (114.6-164.7 lb) and females 25.3-32.7 kg (55.8-72.1 lb).

They are a light tan color, with a white underbelly; males also have a dark brown mane down their backs. Their legs have a black and white pattern. They have a lighter rump with a dark brown tail. Males begin growing a beard at age 2 or 3, which continues to grow longer and darker as they age. During the autumn breeding season, mature males grow a "rutting fur" on their breast and sides which is very dark brown. It appears in October in 3-4  year old males, but it may appear as early as July or August in older males age 6 and up. However, not all males develop rutting fur, even at a mature age.

Nubian ibexes have long, thin horns that extend up and then backwards and down. Male horns are thicker than female horns, and grow large bulges which prevent the horns from sliding while the males are locked in combat.

Distribution
Historically, Nubian ibex were distributed across the Middle East and Northeastern Africa.

Its range today is within Egypt, Jordan, Oman, Israel, Palestine, Saudi Arabia, and Sudan. It was extirpated in Lebanon, though a captive breeding and reintroduction process is underway. It has also been extirpated in Syria. Its presence and population is uncertain in Ethiopia, Eritrea, and Yemen.

Ecology and Behavior

Feeding and Ecological Relationships 
Nubian ibex live in rough, dry, mountainous terrain, where they eat mainly grasses and leaves, especially from Acacia trees (Genus Vachellia). They forage for food on the ground and may also rear up on their hind legs to reach leaves in trees. They can climb into trees while feeding. Ibex preferentially feed in spaces that are close to cliffs where they can easily escape predators, demonstrating a Landscape of Fear: the farther from cliffs, the more vigilant ibex become. Ibex will also spend more time feeding in green patches with high nutritional quality and that are closer to water sources.

They are preyed upon by leopards (Panthera pardus), Arabian wolves (Canis lupus arabs), golden jackals (Canis aureus), red foxes (Vulpes vulpes), eagles, and bearded vultures (Gypaetus barbatus). When alarmed, they emit a shrill call to alert other ibex of danger. They may host parasites including the ibex fly (Lipoptena chalcomelanea), fleas and ticks (Hyalommina rhipicephaloides). They have also been found with brain cysts caused by the parasite Taenia multiceps. Nubian ibex have a mutualistic relationship with Tristram's starling (Onycognathus tristrumil), a small bird that eats the parasites on the ibex's skin. They share their habitat with numerous other herbivores, including rock hyrax (Procavia capensis), Arabian oryx (Oryx leucoryx), gazelles (Genus gazella), and Asiatic wild ass (Equus hemionus).

Social Behavior 
Ibex are social and herds tend to consist of females, young, and males up to the age of about three years. Herds are typically up to 20 individuals, but may reach as high as 50. Female herds are often composed of related individuals that follow a dominance hierarchy. The males are solitary or form more transitory bands of up to eight individuals. During the breeding season, males join the female-based herds for the six- to eight-week rut. Large males then do battle with much clashing of horns.

Movement 
Nubian ibexes are diurnal, meaning they are active during the day, and rest at night. Like other ibex and goats, Nubian ibex spend much of their time on and around cliffs, which offer safety from potential predators. Ibex perceive a greater predation risk as they move farther away from cliffs. They climb and leap with ease, spanning several meters horizontally and vertically in a single leap. Ibex typically traverse cliffs in single file when possible, and keeping relatively horizontal. Their repeated movement over time creates well-worn hillside trails.

Ibex migrate throughout the day and throughout the year. During the day, they navigate between food patches as they forage. They may rest throughout the day to chew their cud, especially around midday. Additionally, on cold winter days, ibex in Egypt have been documented following the path of the sun each day to stay warm. At night, they sleep on cliff sides in small depressions that they dig. These shallow diggings create microhabitats where a diverse range of seedlings can germinate, adding to the habitat's diversity. In winter and early spring, the Middle East's rainy season, ibex often disperse to open plateaus where they can feed on new plant life. In the hot, dry summer, they congregate around shaded oases with water and greenery.

Reproduction 
Mating season is typically in October and November, during which a dominant male will pursue several females. Males produce a strong secretion when in estrous. As they pursue potential mates, they smell the females' anal region with lip curled up (Flehmen). Males can reach breeding maturity as young as 2 years, but may not be allowed to mate until age 5 when they are strong enough to fend off rival males. Females can breed as young as six months old, but often don't breed until age 1-3. Studies suggest that some Nubian ibex subpopulations are developing a second mating season in the spring, in response to hyper-arid climates.

Gestation lasts 5 months. Litters of 1-2 kids are born between March and July, although the majority of births are synchronized in a 3-4 week period that peaks in late March and April. Females leave the herd to give birth in a secluded space. Newborns can stand within 15 minutes of birth, and can nurse within two hours. The mother and young rejoin the herd in a few days, joining other mothers and young to form a crèche for several weeks. Leaving kids in a sheltered crèche allows mothers to seek out richer food patches and spaces that are farther from cliffs, compared to mothers that keep their kids with them at all times. Kids are weaned around 4 months old. Females reach mature size at age 3-4, while males reach it around 6 years old. Nubian ibex can live up to 12 years in the wild and 18 years in captivity.

Evolutionary History

Fossil History 
The earliest remains of Nubian ibex in Israel date back approximately 150,000 years. In spite of the growing presence of livestock like domesticated goats over the last 10,000 years, Nubian ibex in the region have remained present throughout this time. However, their abundance has fluctuated over time in places like Ein Gedi, where they showed an increase in population in the Late Holocene, between 949 and 5,164 years ago.

Genetic History 
The genetic makeup of Nubian ibex as a species has remained unchanged for at least 2,000 years.

Phylogeny 
The Nubian ibex shares a genus, Capra, with all other ibex and goats. Phylogenetic reconstructions of the ibex/goat family tree have mixed results, with different studies reaching different conclusions.

One Y-chromosomal DNA analysis suggests two clades (subgroups) within the genus: The first clade contains domestic goats (C. hircus), bezoars (Capra aegagrus), and markhors (C. falconeri). The second clade contains all other ibex, including the Nubian ibex. In this analysis, the Nubian ibex is monophyletic (most closely related) to the Siberian ibex (C. sibirica).

However, when the same study analyzed Mitochondrial DNA, it was suggested that all species in genus Capra are in one clade except for the Siberian ibex. The study's authors provide potential explanations for this discrepancy, including a possible ancient hybridization of the ancestors of the two Y-chromosome clades.

A separate mitochondrial study suggests that the Nubian ibex forms a separate, more ancient offshoot from most other ibex and may be monophyletic with the Siberian ibex.

An additional Y-chromosomal DNA and mitochondrial DNA study concludes that Nubian ibex are most closely related to Ethiopia's Walia ibex (C. walie), and they may have separated about 800,000 years ago.

Another study used multidimensional scaling (MDS) to suggest that Nubian ibex are more closely related to Alpine ibex and European ibex than to all others.

Genetic Adaptations to the Desert 
Genetic analyses identify 22 positively selected genes in Nubian ibex, when compared to domestic goats (Capra hircus). The genes affect such functions as immune response, protein ubiquitination, olfactory transduction, and visual development. 3 of the genes have evolved to develop skin barriers that mitigate solar radiation in the hot desert.

Physiology 
Nubian ibex produce relatively low rates of tears compared to other animal species, leaving them highly susceptible to infection.

Blood composition in Nubian ibex changes throughout the year. In the dry summer season, there is an increased concentration of hemoglobin, glucose, and total plasma protein. In the winter rainy season, there is an increase in blood urea nitrogen, albumin, and globulin. Some components of the blood remain consistent year round, including calcium, magnesium, and phosphorus.

Nubian ibex can balance their body's nitrogen levels on poor quality diets by reabsorbing large quantities of their bodies' urea. This slows their metabolism when only poor quality food is available, but Nubian ibex can regain lost body mass rapidly upon returning to a higher quality diet. Nubian ibex and other desert-dwelling ungulates have elevated isotopes of Nitrogen (δ15N) due to their diet of plants that grow in denitrified soils.

Yaez (Nubian ibex x domestic goat hybrid) Physiology Studies 
In the 1970s, researchers in Lahav, Israel, began breeding and studying hybrids of Nubian ibex and domestic goats, called "Yaez" ("יעז")  In one study of these hybrids, plasma testosterone peaked in August and testes size peaked in September–October. In a study on reproduction, researchers found that females were more likely to abort their young if they were first-time pregnancies and triplets (as opposed to smaller litters). Mortality rates of young were highest in spring and lowest in winter. Kid mortality rates increased with a higher proportion of ibex genes. When researchers compared the growth rate of male goat and Yaez kids, they found that young goats experience a higher growth rate in spring while Yaez kids grow faster in summer.

Human Impacts and Conservation Status

Human Impacts 
The International Union for Conservation of Nature (IUCN) has classified the Nubian ibex as "vulnerable" on the basis that fewer than 10,000 mature individuals remain and the population is declining. Threats faced by the animal include competition with livestock for water and fodder, hunting pressure, habitat fragmentation, and habitat destruction.

Ecotourism and outdoor recreation may disturb ibex in nature reserves, causing them to change their behavior in order to avoid people. Human presence in nature reserves may also contribute to decreased reproductive rates in ibex; when tourists stopped visiting Israel's Ein Avdat Nature Reserve during Covid lockdown in 2020, the ratio of young to female ibex more than doubled.

Conversely, some ibex have become habituated to human settlements and popular nature reserves, leading to potential conflict. Habituation is demonstrated by decreased vigilance in areas with greater human presence. These subpopulations seek out towns due to abundant food, shelter, and protection from predators. Their habituation leads to property damage, consuming harmful substances like garbage, and reduced antipredator responses. Ibex have been recorded standing on vehicles and entering buildings.

Conservation and Population Status by Country 
As of 2020, the IUCN and other sources estimate wild Nubian ibex populations by country as follows:

Egypt: 600 - 1,250  
Two main populations are present, one in the Eastern Desert to the east of the Nile River and one in the South Sinai. The Eastern Desert population contains 400 - 1,000 individuals in reserves that include Elba Protectorate and Wadi Gemal Protected Area. A further 200-250 individuals reside in the South Sinai region, sheltered by the St. Katherine Protected Area, Taba Protected Area and Abu Gallum Protected Area. The populations are declining due to poaching. Egypt's Nubian ibex are officially protected by Agricultural Law No. 53/l 966 and amendment 1012 July 1992.

Eritrea: Population and presence unknown  
Due to civil unrest, no recent population estimates have been documented. On 16 March 1959, the British established the Yob Wildlife Reserve in northern Eritrea specifically to protect significant populations of Nubian ibex in the area.

Ethiopia: Population and presence unknown  
Due to civil unrest, no recent population estimates have been documented.

Israel & Palestine: 1,200 - 1,400  
The historically dense ibex population, described in the Hebrew Bible (Psalm 104:18), was decimated in the wake of the First World War when the sudden availability of rifles enabled Bedouin to hunt them to near extinction. After the establishment of the State of Israel, when hunting was outlawed and nature reserves were created in which they were protected, the ibex population rebounded.

Three primary ibex populations exist in Israel: in the Negev Highlands, Eilat Mountains, and the Judean Desert, which traverses into the Palestinian West Bank. There is habitat connectivity between these population centers, allowing for gene flow. An additional small population was established in the Golan Heights through reintroduction in 1970. The Judean Desert population is home to approximately 800 individuals and the Negev Highlands are inhabited by around 400. Israel's population is relatively stable and strongly protected, with over 80% of the population range located within wildlife reserves. Israel's Nature and Parks Authority conducts an annual population count using visual surveys and trail cameras. Israel's Nubian ibex are officially protected by the 1955 Wildlife Protection Law.

Jordan: 480 - 600  
Once nearly extirpated in the country, Jordan has re-established their ibex population through captive breeding and reintroduction programs. Population strongholds exist within protected areas, including around 250 ibex in Dana Biosphere Reserve, 200 in Wadi Mujib Biosphere Reserve, 100 in Wadi Rum World Heritage Area. Additionally, at least 60 ibex have been released into the wilderness to join other small populations. Reports suggest that the population is growing within protected areas. Their main threat is hunting. Jordan's Nubian ibex are officially protected from hunting under Agriculture Law No. 13, Appendix I.

Lebanon: 19; Reintroduction in Progress  
Nubian ibex have been extinct in Lebanon since the mid-19th Century. In 2017, a small herd was brought to Al Shouf Cedar Nature Reserve from Jordan to re-establish a breeding population. Now the herd is living semi-wild in an enclosure within the reserve, with plans to fully release them into the wild in the near future.

Oman: 700 - 1,350  
Oman's largest ibex population stronghold is in the Dhofar Mountains, with 600-1,100 individuals. Another 100-250 ibex live in and near Al Wusta Wildlife Reserve, in the Huqf Escarpment and Janabi Hills. The population is in decline due to poaching, habitat degradation, and human expansion. Oman's Nubian ibex are protected under Ministry of Diwan Affairs, Ministerial Decision No. 4 (1976).

Saudi Arabia: Present, no official population estimate  
Small ibex populations are present in protected areas, including the Hawtat bani Tamim Ibex Reserve. The population of this reserve has declined by 75% since 2005 due to poaching. In 2022, Saudi Arabia began a reintroduction program in an effort to rescue the population. Saudi Arabia's Nubian ibex are officially protected by a 1979 hunting by-law.

Sudan: Potentially a few hundred; no official population estimate  
Prior to 2010, surveys suggested a small population in the Red Sea Hills and the areas around Port Sudan. However, due to civil unrest, no recent population estimates have been documented. Sudan's Nubian ibex are listed as a permit-only hunted species under the 1992 Wildlife Conservation Act.

Yemen: Likely present, no official population estimate  
Due to civil unrest, no recent population estimates have been documented.

Captive Populations

Africa 
Nubian ibex live in Egypt's Giza Zoo.

Asia 
Nubian ibex live in 16 zoos across Israel, including a breeding herd in the Jerusalem Biblical Zoo. They live in 3 zoos across the United Arab Emirates and 1 zoo in Singapore. Nubian ibex live in at least one facility in Oman, the Bait Al Barakah breeding centre. Oman's wild ibex population is genetically distinct from its captive population, suggesting that the captive animals descend from a different population.

Europe 
Nubian ibex live in one zoo in each of the following countries: Estonia, France, Germany, Poland, and Switzerland.

North America: At least 73  
As of December 2013, at least 34 males and 39 females live across 8 captive facilities; 7 of these facilities are accredited by the Association of Zoos and Aquariums (AZA). They are all descend from ibex that lived in Israel's Yotvata Hai-Bar Nature Reserve. Captive ibex managers worried that one ibex group had hybrid ancestry due to morphological differences from other Nubian ibex, but genetic analysis suggested that they were pure-bred, and that differences were only due to intraspecific genetic variation.

Cultural Significance and Human Exploitation

Ancient Middle Eastern Cultures 
Nubian ibex have been a common image in petroglyphs (rock art), metal work, and pottery across the Middle East for thousands of years. One example is a life-sized image carved in sandstone in Egypt, dated to the Upper Paleolithic. In petroglyphs, ibex are often portrayed as hunted by dogs and human archers. They are also frequently depicted alongside celestial imagery such as a star, sun, cross, or circle.

The ibex's role in artwork has been suggested as representing literal acts like ritual hunts, as well as spiritual and metaphorical concepts such as resurrection, seasonal cycles of rain and drought, and the interplay of life and death. Ibex may have represented ancient Middle Eastern deities such as Dumuzi (Tamuz) and Dushara.  They are often identified with the constellation Capricorn in Mesopotamian-Iranian artwork from the 4th Millennium BCE.

A common motif in ancient Middle Eastern art contains a sacred tree, often the Tree of Life, flanked on each side by an ibex. This motif is exemplified in the Cult Stand from Ta-anach from the 10th Century BCE, which also contains two ibex and other nature-themed carvings. It is thought to depict the relationship of Yahweh (God) and Asherah, a Semitic, nature-oriented goddess whose essence was later integrated into Judaism.

Judaism 
The Biblical heroine Yael's name means "Ibex" in Hebrew. The Tanakh (Hebrew Bible) contains several references to ibex: "The high mountains belong to the ibex" (Psalms 104:18). "A loving female ibex" (Proverbs 5:19). Ibex are one of the species whose horns can be used to construct a Shofar (Jewish religious musical horn): "The shofar that was used on Rosh HaShana in the Temple was made from the straight horn of an ibex, and its mouth, the mouthpiece into which one blows, was plated with gold" (Mishnah Rosh Hashana 3:4). They are a Kosher animal, meaning that, when prepared properly, the ibex can be eaten under religious law. Ibex skin was sometimes used to make parchments in ancient Israel.

Yael (יָעֵל) remains a common name for Jews, and is one of the most popular female baby names in Israel. The Nubian ibex is the symbol of the Israel Nature and Parks Authority (INPA). It was chosen due to its iconic representation of Israeli wildlife, as well as for the resemblance of its rounded horn to a Roman arch, representing local archaeological history. The INPA works to conserve both nature and culture.

Bedouin Culture 
Bedouin have historically raised young Nubian ibex in integrated herds with domestic goats, with whom the ibex can viably interbreed. The Ma'aza Bedouin of Egypt's Eastern Desert have named several locations based on ibex presence and behavior. Bedouin have traditionally hunted ibex for food and skin.

Yemen 
In Yemen, the ibex is a longstanding symbol of national identity, representing many positive attributes of the Yemeni people. An annual National Ibex Day, on 22 January, has been proposed to help protect the animal.

Contemporary Media 
The Nubian ibex in particular was in the BBC documentary Life, and featured prominently in the popular television documentary series Planet Earth (episode five, "Deserts").

Ecotourism 
Nubian ibex imagery is prominent in Ecotourism promotion. The Israeli town of Mitzpe Ramon, where habituated ibex are frequently found, features a hotel called the Ibex Inn. Jordan's Wadi Rum features a tour and camping company called Wadi Rum Ibex. 

Many Middle Eastern tour companies encourage clients to join them for an opportunity to view these animals in the wild.

See also 

 List of mammals of Israel
 List of animals in the Bible
 List of mammals of Jordan
 List of mammals of Egypt

References 

Capra (genus)
Mammals of Ethiopia
Mammals of the Middle East
Fauna of Jordan
Mammals of the Arabian Peninsula
Mammals described in 1825
Taxa named by Frédéric Cuvier
Fauna of Israel